Claire Greenhill is a British zoologist and the chief editor of Nature Reviews Endocrinology.

Education 
Greenhill has a bachelor's degree in zoology from Durham University, and a master's degree in conservation biology from the University of Kent.

Career 
Greenhill joined Nature Research in 2009 as an editorial assistant before working at Nature Reviews Gastroenterology & Hepatology and Nature Reviews Endocrinology. At Nature Reviews Endocrinology she was promoted to associate editor, to senior editor, and in 2015, to chief editor.

Selected publications 

 Ceri A. Fielding, Gareth W. Jones, Rachel M. McLoughlin, Louise McLeod, Victoria J. Hammond, Javier Uceda, Anwen S. Williams, Mark Lambie, Thomas L. Foster, Chia-Te Liao, Christopher M. Rice, Claire J. Greenhill, Chantal S. Colmont, Emily Hams, Barbara Coles, Ann Kift-Morgan, Zarabeth Newton, Katherine J. Craig, John D. Williams, Geraint T. Williams, Simon J. Davies, Ian R. Humphreys, Valerie B. O’Donnell, Philip R. Taylor, Brendan J. Jenkins, Nicholas Topley, Simon A. Jones, Interleukin-6 Signaling Drives Fibrosis in Unresolved Inflammation, Immunity, Volume 40, Issue 1, 2014, Pages 40–50, ISSN 1074-7613, https://doi.org/10.1016/j.immuni.2013.10.022.
 Claire J. Greenhill, Stefan Rose-John, Rami Lissilaa, Walter Ferlin, Matthias Ernst, Paul J. Hertzog, Ashley Mansell, Brendan J. Jenkins, IL-6 Trans-Signaling Modulates TLR4-Dependent Inflammatory Responses via STAT3, Journal of Immunology January 15, 2011, 186 (2) 1199-1208; DOI: 10.4049/jimmunol.1002971

Family life 
Greenhill lives in London, England.

References 

Academic journal editors
Alumni of Durham University
Alumni of the University of Kent
20th-century British zoologists
21st-century British zoologists
Living people
Year of birth missing (living people)